FAFSWAG is an arts collective of Māori and Pacific LGBTQI+ artists and activists founded in Auckland, New Zealand in 2013. They explore and celebrate the unique identity of gender fluid Pacific people and LGBTQI+ communities in multi-disciplinary art forms. In 2020 FAFSWAG was awarded an Arts Laureate from the New Zealand Arts Foundation, and they also represented New Zealand at the Biennale of Sydney.

Background 
Pati Solomona Tyrell and Tanu Gago formed the collective in 2013. The project grew from a photography project of Gago's that was a part of a university project. FAFSWAG create art and experiences in many different art forms with a strong online focus. Their goal is to "celebrate Queer Brown bodies, contemporary Pacific arts, and cultural restoration". FAFSWAG are committed to social change; they challenge the lack of Indigenous LGBQI representation in creative industries and they articulate through their art projects the fluid gender spectrum in Pacific culture. The collective's name is a portmanteau between fa'afafine and swag.

Initially there were ten artists in the collective and by 2020 in addition to Tyrell and Gago FAFSWAG artists included: Jermaine Dean, Falencie Filipo, Tapuaki Helu, Elyssia Wilson Heti, Nahora Ioane, Hōhua Ropate Kurene, Moe Laga,  Ilalio Loau, Tim Swann and James Waititi.

The first FAFSWAG Aitu Ball was held in South Auckland in 2013, however from 2016 balls have been held in central Auckland. At the core is the 'queer brown community' and the dance form vogue that originated in New York amongst marginalised African American queer communities. The FAFSWAG ball is an inclusive space that celebrates the unique culture of Māori and Pacific and also invites participation from others, "whether you're Asian or Indian or Pākehā: there’s a place for you in that space as well.”

They were the 2017 Company in Residence at Basement Theatre, and were the winners of the 2017 Auckland Theatre Award for best overall body of work as a result. In 2018, FAFSWAG held a ball at the Auckland Art Gallery. In 2019, founder Tanu Gago was awarded the New Zealand Order of Merit for services to art and the LGBTIQ+ community.

In 2020 a production Fa'aafa was scheduled in Berlin at HAU Hebbel am Ufer, (the production was cancelled). The name Fa'aafa is a Samoan term recognising a third gender, and the production combined poetry from Tusiata Avia, 'adornment of voguing', movement and sound. For their Sydney Biennale project in 2020 FAFSWAG were required to re-vision it to be online due to Covid-19 restrictions. The project was named CODESWITCH: Relearn, Reimagine, Recreate – a FAFSWAG Manifesto for the 22nd Biennale of Sydney. It was made up of a number of works including Protection (2020) by Nahora Ioane and Tanu Gago, created in response to the criminalisation of homosexuality in the Cook Islands; Whānau Ariki (2020) by Amy Lautogo, Ria Hiroki and Elyssia Wilson Heti, a  'game-like experience of dressing a woman' with the aim of decolonizing the bodies of the artists; and M A T A L A by artists Hohua Ropate Kurene and Tapuaki Helu, a series of photographs of men and flowers with themes of manhood, identity, sexuality and intimacy.

Other collaborators FAFSWAG have made projects with include Apple, Air New Zealand, The Discovery Channel, Les Mills, and Coco Solid. FAFSWAG have presented at the Auckland Art Gallery, the Auckland War Memorial Museum, Artspace Aotearoa, and the Centre of Contemporary Art, Christchurch.

Artistry 

FAFSWAG is inspired by New York Ball culture. Founder Tanu Gago felt that queer spaces for Pasifika can act as a counter to traditional  Pasifika voices in the community, which tend to be older, more conservative and more religious.

Exhibitions & works 

2013: Te Puke o Tara Community Centre, FAFSWAG's first vogue ball
2015: Studio One Toi Tū
2016: Family Bar, Karangahape Road
2017: FAFSWAG became the company in residence at Basement Theatre
2017: Artspace Aotearoa
2017: Making Space: FAFSWAG, COCA (Centre of Contemporary Art)
2018: Auckland Museum Tāmaki Paenga Hira Late at the Museum event, Explicit Inclusion Identity.
2018: Auckland Art Gallery Toi o Tāmaki, documentary launch
2018: FAFSWAG Aitu Ball Raynham Park Studio, Karangahape Road, Auckland
2018/19: FAFSWAGVOGUE.COM – an online interactive documentary about Auckland's dance vogue culture, directed by Tanu Gago, produced by Piki Films, and featured at the Centre Pompidou in Paris in 2018
2019: Where's My Room 7min music video in collaboration with Neil and Liam Finn directed by Sam Kristofski and choreographed by Pati Solomona Tyrell
2020: CODESWITCH: Relearn, Reimagine, Recreate – a FAFSWAG Manifesto for the 22nd Biennale of Sydney, 22nd Sydney Biennale
2020: Biennale of Sydney, representing New Zealand
2020: HAU Hebbel am Ufer, Berlin

Awards 
2017: Auckland Theatre Award for best overall body of work
2020: Arts Foundation Laureate 2020 – Interdisciplinary Arts

References

External links 
 Fafswagvogue.com

2013 establishments in New Zealand
21st-century New Zealand artists
21st-century New Zealand dancers
New Zealand artist groups and collectives
Arts organizations established in 2013
Ball culture
Fa'afafine
LGBT and multiculturalism
New Zealand LGBT artists
LGBT arts organizations
LGBT organisations in New Zealand
LGBT culture in New Zealand
New Zealand contemporary artists
Organisations based in Auckland
Performance artist collectives
Polynesian-New Zealand culture in Auckland
Subcultures
Transgender in Oceania